Zone A of the 1994 Davis Cup Europe/Africa Group III was one of two zones in the Europe/Africa Group III of the 1994 Davis Cup. 10 teams competed across two pools in a round robin competition, with the top team in each pool advancing to Group II in 1995.

Participating nations

Draw
 Venue: Hôtel Ivoire, Abidjan, Ivory Coast
 Date: 4–8 May

Group A

Group B

  and  promoted to Group II in 1995.

Group A

Djibouti vs. Georgia

San Marino vs. Zambia

Ivory Coast vs. Djibouti

Georgia vs. San Marino

Ivory Coast vs. Georgia

Djibouti vs. Zambia

Ivory Coast vs. Zambia

Djibouti vs. San Marino

Ivory Coast vs. San Marino

Georgia vs. Zambia

Group B

Algeria vs. Belarus

Benin vs. Cameroon

Algeria vs. Togo

Belarus vs. Benin

Algeria vs. Cameroon

Belarus vs. Togo

Algeria vs. Benin

Cameroon vs. Togo

Belarus vs. Cameroon

Benin vs. Togo

References

External links
Davis Cup official website

Davis Cup Europe/Africa Zone
Europe Africa Zone Group III